Paavo Valdemar Virtanen (11 March 1915 – 27 November 1998) was a Finnish footballer. He played in three matches for the Finland national football team from 1935 to 1937. He was also part of Finland's team for their qualification matches for the 1938 FIFA World Cup. He played his whole career for Helsingin Palloseura. In Mestaruussarja he played 102 games and scored 18 goals. He was part of the squad that won Finnish football championship in 1934 but played only 2 games. In 1935 championship winning team team he was already a regular and played 12 out of 14 games scoring 5 goals.

References

External links
 

1915 births
1998 deaths
Place of birth missing
Association footballers not categorized by position
Finnish footballers
Finland international footballers